The year 2023 is the 30th year in the history of the K-1, an international kickboxing event. The year will start with K-1 World GP 2023: K'Festa 6.

List of events

K-1 World GP 2023: K'Festa 6

K-1 World GP 2023: K'Festa 6 will be a kickboxing event held by K-1, which will be held on March 12, 2023, at the Yoyogi National Gymnasium in Tokyo, Japan.

Background
Four K-1 title fights were announced for the event on January 13, 2023: A K-1 Super Bantamweight Championship bout between champion Akihiro Kaneko and challenger Kompetch Sitsarawatsuer; a K-1 Women's Atomweight Championship bout between champion Phayahong Ayothayafightgym and challenger Miyuu Sugawara; a K-1 Lightweight Championship bout between champion Taio Asahisa and challenger Yuki Yoza; as well as a K-1 Super Welterweight Championship bout between champion Hiromi Wajima and challenger Jomthong Chuwattana.

Three additional title fights were added on January 27: Tetsuya Yamato was booked to make his second K-1 World GP Super Lightweight Championship defense against the former K-1 Lightweight champion Kenta Hayashi, the K-1 Featherweight champion Taito Gunji was scheduled to make his first title defense against View Petchkoson, while the K-1 Women's Flyweight champion Kana Morimoto made her second title defense against the one-time FEA and WAKO world champion Funda Alkayış.

Fight Card

See also
 2023 in Glory  
 2023 in ONE Championship
 2023 in Romanian kickboxing
 2023 in Wu Lin Feng

References

External links
Official website

2023 sport-related lists
K-1 events
2023 in kickboxing
2023 in Japanese sport